Bertie Cecil "Stumpy" Banks (July 11, 1898 – November 15, 1960) was an American college football player and athletic director. He was a prominent running back, receiving five varsity letters for the Clemson Tigers. He scored five touchdowns against Furman in 1917 for a school record. He caught two touchdowns against rival South Carolina in 1916. Banks was captain of both the 1918 and 1919 teams. He was selected All-Southern by John Heisman. After college, he was athletic director at Claflin University.

References

External links

 

1898 births
1960 deaths
All-Southern college football players
American football halfbacks
American football quarterbacks
Claflin Panthers athletic directors
Clemson Tigers football players
People from Orangeburg County, South Carolina
Players of American football from South Carolina